Lee Sang-Ho (Hangul: 이상호, Hanja: 李相昊; born May 22, 1963) is a retired South Korean freestyle wrestler.

In 1987, Lee won the silver medal in the freestyle 48 kg class at the World Wrestling Championships held in Clermont-Ferrand, France.

Lee was considered the favorite for the 1988 Olympic gold medal as two-time world champion Li Jae-Sik did not participated in the Olympics due to North Korea's boycott. However, Lee withdrew the tournament after he dislocated his elbow in the first match against eventual gold medalist Takashi Kobayashi.

External links
Lee Sang-Ho's profile from sports-references

1963 births
Living people
South Korean wrestlers
Olympic wrestlers of South Korea
Wrestlers at the 1988 Summer Olympics
South Korean male sport wrestlers
Wrestlers at the 1986 Asian Games
World Wrestling Championships medalists
Asian Games competitors for South Korea
20th-century South Korean people
21st-century South Korean people